George Frederick Walsh (March 16, 1889 – June 13, 1981) was an American actor. An all-around athlete, who became an actor and later returned to sport, he enjoyed 40 years of fame and was a performer with dual appeal, with women loving his sexy charm and men appreciating his manly bravura.

Known variously as "the Laughing Athletic Thunderbolt", "the Apollo of the Silver Sheet", "the Screen's Greatest Athlete" and "the King of Smiles", Walsh's movie career stretched from the start of true US filmmaking to the Golden Era (22 years) during which time he was featured in approximately 80 productions. He was attached to such studios as Mutual, Chadwick, Triangle, Fox, Universal, Goldwyn, United Artists, and Paramount.

Beginnings
George Frederick Walsh was born in New York City to Elizabeth T. Bruff, the daughter of Irish Catholic immigrants, and Thomas W. Walsh, an Englishman. He was the middle child of three siblings. (His older brother was the prolific film director, Raoul Walsh.) At age 16, he was already accomplished at a variety of sports. While studying law, at Fordham and Georgetown Universities, his skill on the football field was such that he became a minor celebrity. He was also briefly with the Brooklyn Dodgers.

Career

Early career
While recuperating in California from an injury in late 1914, he entered motion pictures (thanks to Raoul) when he was engaged as an extra for D. W. Griffith’s epic The Birth of a Nation (1915). Various bit parts followed, until a small role in The Fencing Master (1915) proved he was capable. Griffith’s confidence in him was such that he included George in an important scene in his masterpiece, Intolerance (1916). While a cast member he met his first wife, the beautiful actress Seena Owen. They had one child together, a daughter named Patricia.

Fox
Walsh proved himself at Reliance/Majestic on the west coast and moved to the newly established Fox Film Corporation on the east coast, becoming a serious rival to Douglas Fairbanks there, as well as a national and international star. His output for the studio was characterized by daring stunts, fights, dramatic pursuits, and happy endings with his female co-stars. He also perfected his comedy timing and learned how to get laughs, though it was far from amusing when he quarreled with William Fox about his salary and departed towards the end of 1920. Two years of ups and downs followed which included Serenade (1921), alongside his sister-in-law, Miriam Cooper; varied personal appearances; vaudeville; an unpleasant divorce trial; and an 18-episode historical serial, entitled With Stanley in Africa (1922).

Goldwyn
A single-picture deal Vanity Fair (1923), at Goldwyn Pictures Corporation, led to a long contract and a quick shift from supporting characters to leads. He cemented his return to the big time with the role of Don Diego, opposite Mary Pickford, in Rosita (1923). (Global audiences saw "America’s Sweetheart" get her first grown-up kiss from Walsh in the Ernst Lubitsch-directed vehicle.) More spectacular still was the announcement that June Mathis had selected him to portray Judah Ben-Hur, in the planned picturization of the classic story of Ben-Hur, by Lew Wallace.

Ben-Hur
The word "fiasco" has been attached to Ben-Hur (1925). Early to mid-production was hampered by problems, on location in Italy and in Hollywood—particularly the sudden merger of Goldwyn with Metro, in spring of 1924, to form Metro-Goldwyn (soon afterwards Metro-Goldwyn-Mayer). Despite Mathis’ belief, a strong track record, and his physical suitability, George Walsh was unceremoniously cast aside (in favor of Ramon Novarro), as were June Mathis herself and the director, Charles Brabin. Following the devastating news—from co-star and friend Francis X. Bushman—George was soon on his way back to the United States. He would remain vexed that newly formed MGM did little to combat rumors he had not been up to standard.

After Ben-Hur
Despite the loss of the part of a lifetime, George Walsh's following enabled him to secure a deal with I. E. Chadwick's independent company (Lionel Barrymore's employer at the time). From 1925 to 1926 he was cast in a series of Fox-like entertainments, most of which were well-received and popular. However, broken promises prompted Walsh's departure for the lower profile, but industrious, Excellent Pictures Corporation. While there, he appeared in several economically produced silents, including The Kick-Off (1926), Broadway Drifter (1927), His Rise to Fame (1927), and Inspiration (1928).

Later career
 
It was not until 1932 that George Walsh appeared in a talkie, when his brother revived his career by casting him as a criminal in Me and My Gal (1932), with Spencer Tracy and Joan Bennett. The part of 'Duke' Castenega convinced himself and others there was life in him yet, and for the next four years he kept busy as a supporting actor and bit part player—a common fate for silent era performers in the age of sound. His retirement was triggered by the fact he was approaching fifty and was no longer in good shape.

After Hollywood
Following the conclusion of his acting career, Walsh returned to horse training and horse breeding, his occupation between silents and talkies. For a time, George trained his brother Raoul's stable of Thoroughbred racehorses.
 Their horse Sunset Trail competed in the 1937 Kentucky Derby won by War Admiral who went on to win the U.S. Triple Crown. Sunset Trail finished sixteenth in a field of twenty runners.

In the 1940s, he married for a second time and enjoyed many years of happy retirement in California. The destruction/loss of two-thirds of his movies meant he could not be included in silent film compilations on TV in the 1960s/70s. Regardless, he was interviewed by historians and journalists who sought him out for profiles, articles and anecdotes.

Death
 
He died in Pomona, California of pneumonia at the age of 92. He is buried in San Gabriel Cemetery, Los Angeles.

Selected filmography

 The Birth of a Nation (1915) - Minor Role (uncredited)
 The Fencing Master (1915)
 A Bad Man and Others (1915)
 Don Quixote (1915)
 The Serpent (1916)
 Gold and the Woman (1916)
 Blue Blood and Red (1916)
 The Beast (1916)
 Intolerance (1916)
 The Island of Desire (1917)
 Melting Millions (1917)
 The Book Agent (1917)
 The Honor System (1917)
 The Pride of New York (1917)
 The Yankee Way (1917)
 Some Boy! (1917)
 Jack Spurlock, Prodigal (1918)
 On the Jump (1918)
 The Kid Is Clever (1918) - Himself / Kirk White
 Luck and Pluck (1919)
 Never Say Quit (1919)
 Help! Help! Police! (1919)
 Putting One Over (1919)
 The Winning Stroke (1919)
 The Shark (1920)
 A Manhattan Knight (1920)
 The Plunger (1920)
 The Dead Line (1920)
 Dynamite Allen (1921)
 With Stanley in Africa (1922)
 Vanity Fair (1923)
 Rosita (1923)
 Slave of Desire (1923)
 Reno (1923)
 The Miracle Makers (1923)
 Souls for Sale (1923) - Himself (uncredited)
 American Pluck (1925)
 Ben-Hur: A Tale of the Christ (1925 film) (1925) (he recorded almost the entire film, but was replaced by Ramon Novarro)
 Blue Blood (1925)
 A Man of Quality (1926)
 The Prince of Broadway (1926)
 The Test of Donald Norton (1926)
 Striving for Fortune (1926)
 Back to Liberty (1927)
 The Broadway Drifter (1927)
 The Winning Oar (1927)
 His Rise to Fame  (1927)  
 Combat (1927)
 Inspiration (1928)
 Me and My Gal (1932)
 Out of Singapore (1932)
 The Return of Casey Jones (1933)
 The Bowery (1933)
 Black Beauty (1933)
 Cleopatra (1934)
 The Live Wire (1936)

References

External links

1889 births
1981 deaths
American people of English descent
American people of Irish descent
American male film actors
American male silent film actors
American horse trainers
American racehorse owners and breeders
Deaths from pneumonia in California
20th-century American male actors
Male actors from New York City